The Alabama Soccer Stadium was built in 2004. The complex features covered bench areas for both teams and a press box with seating for 1,500 spectators and standing room for many more. The University of Alabama soccer field was the first home of Alabama soccer and it saw its first action on Oct. 2, 1994, as Alabama played Furman University. The Tide has compiled a 109-56-11 overall record on campus and a 36-29-4 ledger since playing at the Alabama Soccer Complex.

Upon the renovation of Bryant–Denny Stadium the soccer field received a new high definition scoreboard, which was previously housed in Bryant-Denny. The scoreboard is the biggest in the nation for a college soccer field.

External links
 Alabama Soccer Stadium

Soccer venues in Alabama
College soccer venues in the United States
Sports venues completed in 2004
Alabama Crimson Tide women's soccer
2004 establishments in Alabama